Badimia vezdana is a species of lichen in the family Pilocarpaceae. Found in Central America, it was described as new to science in 2011 by lichenologists Robert Lücking, Edit Farkas, and Volkmar Wirth.

References

Pilocarpaceae
Lichen species
Lichens described in 2011
Lichens of Central America
Taxa named by Robert Lücking